The Snowbird is an existing 1916 silent film drama directed by Edwin Carewe and starring Mabel Taliaferro. B. A. Rolfe produced while Metro Pictures distributed.

Plot
The length of the movie is 82 minutes. Its plot, credited to Mary Ryder and June Mathis, concerns a tough society girl’s trip to rural Quebec, where she tangles with the ornery cuss defrauding her father.

Cast
Mabel Taliaferro as Lois Wheeler
Edwin Carewe as Jean Corteau
James Cruze as Bruce Mitchell
Warren Cook as John Wheeler
Arthur Evers as Pierre
Walter Hitchcock as Michael Flynn
Kitty Stevens as Zoe
John Melody as Magistrate Le Blanc

References

External links
 
allmovie

1916 films
American silent feature films
Films directed by Edwin Carewe
1916 drama films
Silent American drama films
American black-and-white films
Metro Pictures films
1910s American films